The cross-border derby is a football match played between Wrexham and Chester. The clubs are 12 miles apart but are Welsh and English respectively (though Chester's Deva Stadium straddles the England–Wales border, and its pitch lies entirely in Wales). 

It is often considered to be one of the biggest rivalries in the lower leagues of English football, due to the close proximity of Wrexham and Chester as they are the largest settlements in the area (North East Wales/West Cheshire) and the only clubs in that area to have played in The Football League. The Welsh–English divide also makes it unique to other football derbies in Britain, as national identity is a large part of the two teams.

Wrexham edged the English–Welsh derby with 30 victories against Chester's 26 in Football League meetings. Between 1986 and 2005, the sides were in the same division for just one season (1994–95) but they were then Football League Two opponents in the three campaigns from 2005–06 to 2007–08. In 2009–10 the sides clashed again in the Conference National after Chester followed Wrexham out of the Football League (although they would only meet once with that game, a 0-0 draw at Wrexham, expunged due to Chester being expelled and going out of business midway through the 2009-10 campaign).

In the 2012–13 season, Chester won promotion to return to the Conference Premier three years after their previous club were expelled from the fifth tier, and played Wrexham at the Racecourse Ground, in a highly anticipated derby, as this was the first since Chester re-formed as a fan-owned club. All away fans had to travel to the match via coaches and police escort and were unable to travel by train, unlike most years. Despite going into the game with a poor form of recent games, Chester won the match 2-0, recording their first win of the season.

The most recent meeting saw Wrexham win 2-0 in March 2018. The two teams are currently separated due to Chester's relegation from the National League at the end of the 2017–18 season which sees them play their football in the National League North, one division below Wrexham.

Games between the two are usually moved to Sunday, with a 12:00 kick off, minimising time for the consumption of alcohol and the risk of the two sets of supporters clashing.

Achievements

Head-to-head summary

Chester City vs Wrexham (1888–2009)

Chester FC vs Wrexham (2013–)

Head-to-head fixtures

Chester City vs Wrexham

Chester FC vs Wrexham

Crossing the divide

Chester City and Wrexham

The following players have played for Chester City and Wrexham. Footballers currently playing in one of the teams are marked bold. Appearances and goals include League only.

Chester FC and Wrexham

The following players have played for Chester FC and Wrexham. Footballers currently playing in one of the teams are marked bold. Appearances and goals include League only.

Chester City, Chester and Wrexham

The following players have played for Chester City, Chester FC and Wrexham. Footballers currently playing in one of the teams are marked bold. Appearances and goals include League only.

Derby appearances and goals

Chester FC vs Wrexham

Below shows the most appeared players and most goals scored within a derby match between Chester and Wrexham. Appearances and Goals include all competitions.

Top all time appearances
After the match played 11 March 2018.

All time goal scorers
After the match played 11 March 2018.

References

Wrexham A.F.C.
Chester F.C.
Chester City F.C.
England football derbies
Wales football derbies